Vayasu Ponnu is a 1978 Indian Tamil-language film directed and edited by K. Shankar. The film stars R. Muthuraman, Latha, and Roja Ramani. It was released on 2 September 1978, and failed commercially.

Plot 

The heroine is brought up by her elder sister but gets attracted to Hippie culture. Her elder sister's friend gives her a mini skirt and revealing top and she starts to get stalked. She is saved by a rich kind middle aged man whose only vice is call girls. She leaves his house and job though he has been decent and kind to her. She rejects the proposal of her new house owner who is a devout Murugan devotee and moves on. She gets gang raped on night and her life is in shambles. The kind man, her elder sister, hippie friend and the devotee back her up unquestioningly with the devotee wanting to marry her. He gets killed in a brawl while she is in altar. She gets her elder sister and hippie friend married and goes to live off with the kind man in an unnamed relationship which is hinted to be platonic.

Cast 
 R. Muthuraman
 Latha
 Roja Ramani
 M. N. Nambiar
 Jai Ganesh
 V. S. Raghavan
 M. N. Rajam
 Thengai Srinivasan
 Rajasulochana
 A. Sakunthala
 Shanmugasundari

Production 
Vayasu Ponnu was directed and edited by K. Shankar. It was produced by K. N. Kunjappan under R. G. M. Productions. The screenplay was written by R. K. Shanmugham, based on a story by Manian.

Soundtrack 
The soundtrack was composed by M. S. Viswanathan, while the lyrics were written by Vaali and Muthulingam. The song "Kaanchi Pattuduththi" is set in the Carnatic raga known as Kalyanavasantam.
"Kaanji Pattudutti" – K. J. Yesudas, Savithri
"Matthalattha" – S. P. Balasubrahmanyam
"Mein Hoon Lucky" – Vani Jairam
"Adho Oru" – T. M. Soundarrajan, Vani Jairam

Release 
Vayasu Ponnu was released on 2 September 1978, and failed commercially. However, Muthulingam won the Tamil Nadu State Film Award for Best Lyricist for "Kaanchi Pattuduththi".

References

External links 
 

1970s Tamil-language films
1978 films
Films directed by K. Shankar
Films scored by M. S. Viswanathan